Line 4 (Italian: Linea 4) is a commuter rail service operated by the Ente Autonomo Volturno (EAV) company in the city of Naples, Italy. It connects 7 stations.

Stations

See also 
 Naples Metro
 List of suburban and commuter rail systems

References

External links 
 Urbanrail.net Naples rail website

Transport in Naples